"We Don't Care" is the fourth single from Akon's third studio album, Freedom. The single was released as a digital download in the United Kingdom on July 6, 2009. The single reached the B-list on BBC Radio 1.

Video
The video for the song was released to YouTube on June 22, 2009. The video features both live performance footage and backstage footage from Akon's Konvicted Tour.

Charts

The track peaked at #61 on the UK Singles Chart. The song also peaked at number 35 on the UK R&B Chart.

Track listing
 Digital download
 "We Don't Care" (Video Version) - 3:53

 Promotional CD single
 "We Don't Care" (Radio Edit) - 3:20
 "We Don't Care" (Album Version) - 4:16

Release history

References

2009 singles
Akon songs
Songs written by Claude Kelly
Song recordings produced by Akon
Music videos directed by Gil Green
2008 songs
Universal Motown Records singles
Songs written by Giorgio Tuinfort
Songs written by Akon